Yew Cheng Hoe  (born 1943) is a former world-class Malaysian badminton player.

Career 
He played on the Malaysian Thomas Cup (men's international) teams of 1963-1964 and 1966-1967,  the latter of which won the world championship. During the 1965-1966 tournament season Cheng Hoe was a frequent runner-up to fellow countryman Tan Aik Huang who dominated international singles competition that year. Cheng Hoe won the Malaysian Open and New Zealand Open singles titles in 1963. With Tan Aik Huang he won men's doubles at the British Commonwealth Games in 1966.

Achievements

Asian Championships 
Men's singles

Southeast Asian Peninsular Games 
Men's singles

Men's doubles

Mixed doubles

Commonwealth Games 
Men's singles

Men's doubles

International tournaments 
Men's singles

Men's doubles

Honours 
  :
 Member of the Order of the Defender of the Realm (A.M.N.) (1972)

References 

1942 births
Living people
Malaysian male badminton players
Malaysian sportspeople of Chinese descent
Commonwealth Games gold medallists for Malaysia
Badminton players at the 1966 British Empire and Commonwealth Games
Asian Games medalists in badminton
Badminton players at the 1966 Asian Games
Badminton players at the 1962 Asian Games
Commonwealth Games medallists in badminton
Asian Games bronze medalists for Malaysia
Asian Games silver medalists for Malaysia
Medalists at the 1962 Asian Games
Medalists at the 1966 Asian Games
Medallists at the 1966 British Empire and Commonwealth Games